Mobsters is a 1991 American crime drama film directed by Michael Karbelnikoff. It details the creation of The Commission. Set in New York City, taking place from 1917 to 1931, it is a semi-fictitious account of the rise of Charles "Lucky" Luciano, Meyer Lansky, Frank Costello, and Benjamin "Bugsy" Siegel. The film stars Christian Slater as Luciano, Patrick Dempsey as Lansky, Costas Mandylor as Costello and Richard Grieco as Siegel, with Michael Gambon, Anthony Quinn, Lara Flynn Boyle, and F. Murray Abraham in supporting roles.

Synopsis

The film recounts the rise of four  Infamous gangsters: Lucky Luciano, Meyer Lansky, Bugsy Siegel, and Frank Costello. The four begin as members of youth gangs on the streets of New York, fighting and hustling as they learn the rules of the street and form strong friendships that benefit them as they grow into their teenage years. The beginning of Prohibition provides them with an entry into organized crime, and under the mentorship of seasoned gangsters such as Arnold Rothstein, they build up a lucrative bootlegging empire.

Despite their success, the four come into conflict with the established leaders of the Mafia, who dislike the idea of working with other criminal organizations to maximize profits and compete with each other for power and influence. Believing that the Mafia must restructure itself in order to thrive, Luciano and Lansky recruit Siegel and Costello to eliminate their bosses and assume control, setting up the Commission and dividing the New York underworld between five families.

Cast

 Christian Slater as Charlie "Lucky" Luciano
 Patrick Dempsey as Meyer Lansky
 Costas Mandylor as Frank Costello
 Richard Grieco as Benjamin "Bugsy" Siegel
 F. Murray Abraham as Arnold Rothstein
 Michael Gambon as Don Maranzano
 Anthony Quinn as Don Masseria
 Lara Flynn Boyle as Mara Motes
 Chris Penn as Tommy Reina
 Nicholas Sadler as Mad Dog Coll
 Andy Romano as Antonio Luciano
 Robert Z'Dar as Rocco
 Frank Collison as Catania
 Rodney Eastman as Joey
 Joe Viterelli as Joe Profaci
 Titus Welliver as Al Capone

Reception
On Rotten Tomatoes, the film holds an approval rating of 9% based on 33 reviews. The website's critics consensus reads: 'Despite an abundance of style and some big names, Mobsters can't escape its empty plotting, numbing violence, and Gangster Movie 101 concepts.' Audiences polled by CinemaScore gave the film an average grade of "B" on an A+ to F scale.

Variety wrote that "Mobsters resembles a cart-before-the-horse case of putting marketing ahead of film-making, as the seemingly can't-miss premise of teen-heartthrob gangsters gets lost in self-important direction, a shoddy script and muddled storytelling."
According to Roger Ebert, the movie's violence and bloodshed are so far over the top that 'they undermine the rest of the film, and approach parody'; he gave it two and a half out of four stars.

Both Anthony Quinn and Christian Slater were nominated for Razzie Awards as Worst Supporting Actor for their performances, but lost to Dan Aykroyd for Nothing But Trouble.

Slater said he was hoping that the film would be like the much more successful Bugsy, but this did not happen: 'Our movie ended up in bits and pieces all over the world," he said. "They had different versions flying to Japan, Europe and every other place. There were extended versions, shortened versions; all kinds of weird versions. In my opinion, audiences never got to see a full film. Somewhere in all that mess, there was a legitimate story. It was there in the script.'

Box office
The film debuted at No. 2 behind Terminator 2: Judgment Day, but failed to make a profit.

References

External links
 
 
 
 
 

1991 films
1991 crime drama films
American biographical films
American crime drama films
Biographical films about gangsters
Films set in the 1910s
Films set in the Roaring Twenties
Films set in the 1930s
Films set in New York City
Films about the American Mafia
Films about Jewish-American organized crime
Films scored by Michael Small
Universal Pictures films
Cultural depictions of Lucky Luciano
Cultural depictions of Frank Costello
Cultural depictions of Bugsy Siegel
Cultural depictions of Arnold Rothstein
Cultural depictions of Mad Dog Coll
Cultural depictions of Al Capone
1991 directorial debut films
Cultural depictions of Meyer Lansky
1990s English-language films
1990s American films